Hull United Association Football Club is a football club in Hull, East Riding of Yorkshire, England. They were members of Division One of the Northern Counties East League after they were granted promotion from the Humber Premier League in the 2014–15 season, only to be demoted after just a single season.
They play at the Steve Prescott Centre having formerly played at Dene Park and KC Lightstream Stadium.

History

Early years and successes
The club was formed in 1993 as St Andrews Police Club, and were founder members of Division One of the Humber Premier League. In 2007–08 the club won Division One, earning promotion to the Premier Division. In 2009 they changed their name to St Andrews, and then to Hull United in 2014, when the club was rebranded after Jamie Waltham and ex-pro Jamie Barnwell-Edinboro joined up with John Duffill and Kenny Sayers, adopting a new nickname ("the Citizens") and changing their kit colours to black and white, echoing Hull City's original kit, although this is widely seen as a common misconception.

Originally based at East Mount Recreation Centre, following their re-branding as Hull United the club moved to Dene Park, located in the village of Dunswell on the northern outskirts of Hull. The ground was originally the home of fellow Northern Counties East League side Hall Road Rangers F.C., who continued to share the ground with United before relocating to Haworth Park ahead of the 2015–16 season. On 15 August 2015 the club renamed the ground the "Breathe for Cameron Stadium" after local child, Cameron Good, who had died due to asthmatic complications during a football match he was involved in.
In January 2015 the club appointed Curtis Woodhouse as manager, replacing chairman/first team manager Jamie Waltham, with fellow ex-Hull City teammate Ian Ashbee also joining as his assistant. One of the club's biggest matches came in March 2015 when they played Hull City Under-21s in the East Riding Senior Cup, beating them 3–2. Following this win, they progressed to the final where they met Bridlington Town at the KC Stadium with Bridlington eventually winning 4–2. After the club finished as Humber Premier Division runners-up at the end of the 2014–15 season, they were admitted to Division One of the Northern Counties East League. It was announced in June 2015 that assistant manager Ian Ashbee was taking over as club chairman, combining the two roles.

2015–16
Hull United opened their new campaign with a 1–0 win over Yorkshire Amateur A.F.C. on 8 August 2015. The next game resulted in a 1–0 defeat at Teversal F.C. in the League Cup. However, they returned to league action with a 3–0 win over Dronfield Town F.C. a few days later, their first home game of the season, which attracted a crowd of 617. They kept up their good league form for the rest of the month, recording wins against Penistone, Westella VIP and a 7–0 thrashing of Grimsby Borough, as well as a draw at Hemsworth. This good run of form continued into September as they beat A.F.C. Emley and lead Glasshoughton Welfare before the game was abandoned early in the second half due to floodlight failure. A few days later they travelled to Selby Town and won 3–1, which meant after 8 games United sat 3 points clear at the top of the league and remained unbeaten.

On 30 September 2015 it was revealed founder of the club and former chairman, Jamie Waltham would no longer be working with the club. Following this, their game against A.F.C. Mansfield was postponed due to being locked out of Dene Park by Jamie Waltham after he and the club were unable to agree on a lease to play there. This prompted the club to find another home. On 21 October the new ground was revealed to be the KC Lightstream Stadium, home of Hull Kingston Rovers. United started life at their new home with a 2–1 victory over Bottesford Town F.C. in the re-arranged fixture from earlier in the season. The game attracted a crowd of 431.

1 December saw the first competitive local derby against city rivals Hall Road Rangers, nicknamed the 'Hull Clasico'. The match ended 1–0 to United after a winning goal scored in the last seconds of the game. On 21 December it was announced that Gary Bradshaw had signed for the club from nearby Scarborough Athletic. His debut came in the second Hull derby against Hall Road on Boxing Day at Haworth Park, however the game ended in defeat for United after another winner in the dying seconds of the game, this time for Hall Road as it ended 2–1. They started 2016 with a 2–1 win against Winterton at the KC Lightstream Stadium, with Gary Bradshaw also getting his first goal for the club. This was to be their last game here as on 13 January the club announced it would no longer be playing at the stadium due to being unable to afford the match day running costs.

On 15 January former North Ferriby captain and Scarborough Athletic Player/Manager Paul Foot signed for the club, joining up with fellow ex Ferriby legend Gary Bradshaw once more. It was revealed on 22 January that the club had made a request to groundshare with Brigg Town, however this was rejected by the league, meaning United would have to play their remaining games away until the end of the season or until a suitable ground could be found. Following this they were deducted 3 points after fielding a suspended player against Hallam F.C. earlier in the season, a game they won 2–0. They played their first game in a month on 2 February, after four games in January were postponed, beating Grimsby Borough 2–1 away, with Paul Foot scoring on his debut.

The following game took place almost two weeks later on 13 February and saw them face North Ferriby in the East Riding Senior Cup for the first ever time. The game was played at South Hunsley School in Melton, just outside of Hull, and ended 2–1 to Ferriby, who fielded a reserve side, knocking United out of the cup. On 31 March manager Curtis Woodhouse left the club but was persuaded to re-join until the end of the season just a couple of days later, with Paul Foot taking charge of the game he missed. It was also confirmed on the club website that they had acquired a 10-year lease of the old Endeavour School sports centre, as part of their recently formed partnership with Hull College, starting from the 2016–17 season.

As United were hit hard by an 18-point deduction for three instances of player irregularities and an inability to obtain a ground/ground-share agreement for next season by 31 March deadline, on 21 April the Northern Counties East League decided to relegate them to a lower league designated by the FA as they have not "received a grading certificate by 31st March and not having an alternative proposal approved at the relevant Board Meeting" and as a consequence for this failure. Eight days later Craig Tock was introduced as the club's new chief executive officer, replacing John Duffill.

After a statement was released from the club, it was revealed they will be participating in the Humber Premier League Division one from the 2016–17 season, with Ian Ashbee leaving his role as chairman and Curtis Woodhouse resigning as first team manager. On 5 July 2016 Hull United appointed Ashley Moon as the new chairman and John Duffill as the Vice Chairman.

Humber Premier League
After leaving the NCEL they were placed in Division One of the Humber Premier League, two leagues below. 2016–17 proved to be a difficult season for United after starting again with virtually no players. John Duffill took on the role of first team head coach and managed to put a side together to start the season. They eventually finished second-from-bottom, one point above Hessle Sporting.

The 2017–18 season saw an upturn in the Citizens' fortunes, after acquiring a number of players and staff from Hanson Jewellers who played the previous season in the league above, as well as several players returning from previous successful seasons for United. Positive results which started off the season continued throughout the campaign, keeping them in promotion contention, and also saw a good cup run in which they reached the semi-final of the Humber Premier League Cup against Pocklington, which they lost 2–0. They achieved promotion after finishing 2nd place.

2018–19 saw the team competing in the Humber Premier League Premier Division once again, but it was a difficult start for them as they won only one of their opening 7 games, drawing one and losing 5. However, after a couple of experienced additions to the squad they managed to turn things around. They finished the season in a very respectable 5th position, however their main success came in the Humber Premier League cup, winning the final on penalties after holding Chalk Lane to a draw in normal time, with Chalk Lane hoping to win the league and cup double for a second season in a row. This was United's second cup win since their rebrand in 2014, after winning it in their first season in 2014–15. They also reached the quarter final of the East Riding Senior Cup once again playing Chalk Lane but lost 2–1.

The following season 2019–20 brought a rather mixed campaign in terms on league form, with lack of consistency being a big problem. Once again there were impressive cup runs though, in both the East Riding Senior Cup, with wins against East Hull and Hemingborough setting up a semi-final tie against North Ferriby F.C., and the Whitehead's Cup where they were unable to retain the trophy after a semi-final defeat against Pocklington. The season was declared null and void in March 2020, along with all other non-league football from step 7 down due to the COVID-19 pandemic.

The 2020–21 campaign saw changes to the ownership of the club, after successfully registering as a Community Benefit Society, memberships can be obtained on the club website with an option of 2020 Club Membership, costing an annual fee of £20.20, or club owner with an annual fee of just £1, the minimum amount a club can charge for a membership with one of the club's objectives being affordable football for all. This was considered the best option to push forward the three main objectives while ensuring no one person can control the club, the club would benefit the community and all members would have limited liability. By December 2020, the club reached 100 owners with 30 being 2020 Members, 72 Club Owner Members and four Junior Members. On the pitch however the new season was still being affected by the COVID-19 pandemic with various restrictions and two separate lockdowns preventing a continuous run of games. After 4 months of no action the league resumed in April and Hull United returned with a 7-1 thrashing of Walkington, followed by a narrow 1-0 defeat by South Cave, however they won their next 5 games before finishing the season with a 3-3 draw away to Pocklington, with a final position of 4th place after playing just 15 games.

After a positive finish to the previous season, the 2021-22 campaign went from bad to worse. With several of the main starting 11 moving on, United struggled to put out a strong team week after week, and with no permanent 1st choice keeper for much of the season, conceded a lot of goals. The first point of the season came after a 4-4 draw with Cherry Burton in December, with the first league win not coming until February when they beat Hessle Rangers 8-3. United finished bottom of the table with only 2 wins and 2 draws, however avoided relegation due to other teams folding and a major shortage of teams in the league.

The start of the 22-23 season had a more positive feel to it, with a changed club crest and investment in new playing shirts, training wear and equipment in a hope to attract new players, the club managed to bring in several new players as well as holding on to some of the more established players from the previous years. The club made appointments to the back room staff too with the vastly experienced Richard Smales appointed to the board after a vote was put out to all club owners. Manager John Duffill opted to appoint a new 1st team captain, long serving player Tresor Kalilwa, in a bid to refresh the culture, mentality and morale following the disappointment of last season.

Stadium
Hull United started at Dene Park, Dunswell, which was owned by co-founder Jamie Waltham, this was also home to Hall Road Rangers for many years before moving to their Haworth Park home. The club consistently brought in big attendances during their time here, usually being at least three figures. After some disagreements and the departure of Waltham, United were then unable to play their games at Dene Park and had to look elsewhere. United had a one-off home game at Roy West Centre, HQ of the East Riding FA where they beat Easington United 9-1 in a cup game.

Hull United announced a new home on 21 October 2015, Craven Park home of Super League side Hull Kingston Rovers in a huge move for the club. The first game was against Bottesford Town and attracted a crowd of 431 and the big derby against city rivals Hall Road Rangers drawing in a somewhat disappointing 242. Attendances were not as high as first hoped, with just 67 turning out for a league match against Teversal F.C. and following the game against Winterton the club announced it would be leaving the stadium after just 2 months and 6 games played with the high match day running costs being a big factor in this decision. A suitable ground could not be found within the city after this, and after a proposed groundshare with Brigg Town until the end of the season was turned down by the league, the club were then forced to play the rest of their home games at the grounds of their opposition, before being relegated out of the league after being unable to confirm a ground with the requited criteria before the deadline.

Since 2016 the club has played its games at Steve Prescott Centre, the former sports facility of the closed down Endeavour High School. The centre had been taken over by Hull College and had undergone refurbishment including a huge development of the floodlit 3G pitch, which is where the team plays its games after 3 seasons playing on the grass pitch.

The club revealed on 30 January 2023 that after long negotiations, with the final decision being made after a vote sent out to club owners, they would be moving to Haworth Park as of the 2023/24 season on a long term lease.

Players

Current squad

Notable players
Former professionals to have played for the club include:
Danny Clarke
Jamie Barnwell-Edinboro
Ian Ashbee
Lawrie Dudfield
Mark Greaves
Martin Foster
Matty Plummer
Gary Bradshaw
Paul Foot

Non-playing staff
Chairman: John Duffill (Interim) 
Vice Chairman: Gary Northage
Chief Executive Officer: Lewis Poucher
Chief Operating Officer: Richard Smales
Finance Director: Sarah Adams
Administration Director: Steve White
Youth Administration Director: Kenny Sayers
Media & Marketing Director: Mel Marsden
Business Development Director: Mike Smith
Youth Finance Director: Tony McCrainor
Director of Football: Paul Goldie

Manager: John Duffill
Assistant Manager: Steve White
Coach: David Brooke
Coach: Paul Goldie
Youth Football Officer (U'13's - U'18's: Kenny Sayers)

Women's Team Manager: Lewis Poucher
Women's Team Assistant Manager: Paul Poucher

Women's Development Team Manager: Mel Marsden
Women's Development Team Coach: Chloe Robinson

Physio: 
Men's Team Captain: Tresor Kalilwa
Woman's Team Captain: Lauren Holmes

Women's team
On 8 June 2020, Hull United's social media accounts announced that the team would be setting up a women's team at level 6 in the pyramid, meaning that they would be able to compete in the Women's FA Cup.

With their first season being disrupted and cut short due to the Covid-19 Pandemic, their second season proved to be a successful one having been crowned champions of the North East Regional Women's Football League Division One South with two games left to spare. They also reached the third round qualifying in the Women's FA Cup for the first time, eventually losing by penalties to Wakefield. They finished the season unbeaten in the league before winning the Women's East Riding Cup in the first ever women's final to be held at the MKM Stadium infront of a crowd of over 800.

Honours

League
Men's
 Humber Premier League
 Runners-up (1): 2014–15
 Humber Premier League Division One
 Runners-up (1): 2017–18
Women's
 North East Regional Women's Football League Division One South
 Winners (1): 2021–22

Cup
Men's 
 Humber Premier League Cup
 Winners (2): 2014–15, 2018–19
 East Riding Senior Cup
 Runners-up (1): 2014–15
Women's 
 Women's East Riding Cup
Winners (1): 2021–22

References

External links

Official website

Football clubs in England
Football clubs in the East Riding of Yorkshire
Association football clubs established in 2005
2005 establishments in England
Sport in Kingston upon Hull
Humber Premier League
Northern Counties East Football League
Police association football clubs in England